Stephen S. Goss (November 16, 1961 – August 24, 2019) was an American jurist who served as judge of the Georgia Court of Appeals.

Education

Goss received his Bachelor of Arts from the University of Georgia and his Juris Doctor from the University of Georgia School of Law.

Legal career

Goss was a partner in the Albany law firms of Watson, Spence, Lowe and Chambless, LLP and Cannon, Meyer von Bremen and Goss, LLP. He also previously served as the solicitor for the Dougherty Circuit Juvenile Court.

State court service

He was appointed as judge of the Dougherty Circuit Juvenile Court and served from 1995 to 1999. He was a member of the Supreme Court of Georgia's Child Placement Project committee. He was later appointed by Governor Barnes to fill a vacancy on the Superior Court of the Dougherty Judicial Circuit in 1999.

Appointment to Georgia Court of Appeals

Goss' name was amongst many to fill one of three vacancies on the Court of Appeals. On May 10, 2018 Goss was appointed by Nathan Deal to serve as a judge on the Court of Appeals of Georgia, replacing retired judge Gary B. Andrews. He was sworn into office on August 1, 2018.

Consideration for Georgia Supreme Court

In November 2016 Goss' was among thirteen candidates being vetted for one of three vacancies on the Georgia Supreme Court.

Personal

Goss was married to the former Dee Collins of Cotton, Mitchell County, Georgia. They were the parents of two daughters, Collins and Clark, and a son, Clint. On August 24, 2019 Goss was found near his home, dead of a gunshot wound.

References

External links
Official Biography on Georgia Judicial Branch website

1961 births
2019 deaths
Place of birth missing
Georgia Court of Appeals judges
Georgia (U.S. state) lawyers
Georgia (U.S. state) state court judges
Suicides by firearm in Georgia (U.S. state)
University of Georgia alumni
University of Georgia School of Law alumni
20th-century American lawyers
21st-century American judges
20th-century American judges
2019 suicides